Elliot Ward is an English footballer who plays as a midfielder for Dorchester Town.

Career
Ward was born in Poole, Dorset. He made his professional football debut for Bournemouth on 9 August 2011, in the League Cup 5–0 victory over Dagenham & Redbridge at Dean Court. He came on as a substitute for Mark Molesley. In January 2012, Ward was sent out on loan to Southern League side Wimborne Town.

References

External links

1994 births
Sportspeople from Poole
Footballers from Dorset
Living people
English footballers
Association football midfielders
AFC Bournemouth players
Wimborne Town F.C. players
Dorchester Town F.C. players
English Football League players